Homecoming is a live double LP by jazz saxophonist Dexter Gordon, recorded at the Village Vanguard in New York City in 1976.  The album's title refers to Gordon's return to the United States after a long residency in Europe.

Track listing
LP 1 
Side A
 “Gingerbread Boy” (Jimmy Heath) - 13:29 
 “Little Red's Fantasy” (Woody Shaw) - 12:30 
Side B
 “Fenja” (Dexter Gordon) - 12:34 
 “In Case You Haven't Heard” (Woody Shaw) - 10:55
LP 2 
Side C
 “It's You Or No One” (Jule Styne, Sammy Cahn) - 13:46 
 “Let's Get Down” (Ronnie Mathews) - 13:03 
Side D
 “Round Midnight” (Hanighen, Williams, Monk) - 13:06
 “Backstairs” (Dexter Gordon) - 12:20 
+ 2 bonus tracks on the 1990 CD re-issue - from the same 1976 Village Vanguard recording session: 
“Fried Bananas” (Gordon) - 14:34
”Body and Soul" (Johnny Green, Frank Eyton, Edward Heyman, Robert Sour) - 13:10

Personnel
 Dexter Gordon - tenor saxophone
 Woody Shaw - trumpet, flugelhorn
 Ronnie Mathews - piano
 Stafford James - bass
 Louis Hayes - drums

External links
 Dexter Gordon album catalog at jazzdisco.org
 Homecoming at Discogs.com

Dexter Gordon albums
1977 albums
Albums recorded at the Village Vanguard